Modern equipment of the Albanian Army is a list of the equipment currently in use with the Albanian Armed Forces. It includes small arms, combat vehicles, aircraft, watercraft, artillery and transport vehicles. Its main mission is the defense of the independence, sovereignty and territorial integrity of the Republic of Albania, participation in humanitarian, combat, non-combat and peace support operations. 
After the integration of the Albania in North Atlantic Treaty Organization (NATO) was start implementing a defence modernisation programme which consist on the demolition of the surplus armament inherited from the communist regime and its replacement with modern weapons of NATO standards.

Modernisation program
The process of modernization of the AAF is based on the short-term, middle-term and long-term objectives and priorities of their restructuring and development aiming at achieving the increase of the operational capacities. The modernization programme started before the country's North Atlantic Treaty Organization membership (on 1 April 2009) with the purchase of armaments produced by the NATO countries. It also started a programme for the disposal and alienation of surplus ammunition inherited from the communist regime for 50 years.

The modernization of the Land Forces began around 2006, starting with Special Forces such as the BFS (then known as the Batalioni i Operacioneve Speciale, BOS) and the Commandos. Seeing their involvement in NATO peacekeeping operations in Iraq and Afghanistan, the need arose for more modern armaments given that until then these branches used old Soviet or Chinese era armaments. In 2007, the Ministry of Defense (MOD) reached agreement with the German company Heckler & Koch for the purchase of several weapons in limited quantities for special forces, including HK146, two variants of H&K G36, HK417, MP7, and variants of H&K USP. Some of them were only for evaluation purposes. In 2009 the Beretta ARX160 was issued in much larger quantities thus becoming the standard assault rifle for the BFS over the HK416 and HK G-36. In 2015, the Colt M4A1 joined ARX160 as standard use alongside it. For the 3 infantry battalions, the modernization started in 2013, initially introducing the as standard handgun the Beretta Px4, as a light machine gun H&K MG4 and H&K MG5 as a General-purpose machine gun.
In 2015 other weapons were introduced over all ground units. The 2nd Infantry Battalion (B2K) was equipped with Colt M4A1. The Military Police was equipped with the Beretta ARX160 and added 4 new Iveco LMV vehicles. The Sako TRG-22 and TGR-44 were distributed to all sniper units, while the Benelli M4 Super 90 to the BFS and MP for Close-quarters combat.
The following year the Italian Government offered an aid package of 5,000 Beretta AR70/90 units, which at the time were in the process of being withdrawn and replaced in favor of the Beretta ARX160 over Italian Army. This package fitted the needs of the Albanian Armed Forces (AAF) as the process of replacing the old Soviet 7.62×39mm ammunition with 5.56×45mm, a task-requirement by Standardization Agreement (STANAG) of NATO allies since Albania's accession in 2009. The process that was expected to last within 10 years, but the aid package helped completing the process 4 years earlier and without additional costs. After the process of replacing the AK47 variants (many of which were locally produced under the name ASh-78 and ASh-82) with the AR70/90 was ended, the rifle became the standard weapon and most used over most Land Forces branches.
In 2017 the Combat Support Battalion (Batalioni Mbështetjes së Luftimit, BML) was equipped with Hirtenberger M6 60mm and Hirtenberger M8 81mm mortars by the Austrian company Hirtenberger Defense Systems. Thus removing from use the Chinese made mortars from the communist period. In March of the same year came the first 77 HMMWV M1114 of an aid package totaling 250 armored vehicles. They are obtained from Excess Defense Articles (EDA) through the Defense Security Cooperation Agency, a United States program to support NATO partners and allies. The vehicles were immediately put at the service of B1K. In 2019 came the second part of the package of 250 vehicles and it consisted of 36 International MaxxPro and 1 MaxxPro Wrecker recovery vehicle. These vehicles joined the previous 3 MaxxPro bringing the total number of MRAPs used by Special Forces to 40.

In 2007, was signed a contracts with the Damen Group for the or completing of the Albanian Naval Forces with patrol vessels to be used to perform a number of tasks and duties, including coastal patrols, search and rescue, control and monitoring of maritime traffic, marine environment protection. The contract envisaged the construction of 4 vessels of the Damen Stan 4207 class, which the first of them would be built in Netherlands and 3 others in the Pasha Liman naval base in Albania. The first patrol vessel, named Iliria P-132, was built and delivered to the Albanian Coast Guard in August 2008. Enabling thus the following construction of 3 other patrol vessels in Pasha Liman Base by Albanian carpenters assisted by the experts of Damen Group. The second patrol vessel Oriku P-133 will be commissioned in September 2011, the third ship, Lisus P-133, will be operational in 2012 and fourth Butrint P-134 in 2013.

Weapons

Vehicles

Aircraft

Watercraft

Albanian Coast Guard

Albanian Navy

References

External links
 Ministry of Defense
 Albanian Armed Forces

 

Military equipment of Albania
Albania
Equipment
Albania